Jonathan Gries (born June 17, 1957) is an American actor, writer, and director. He is best known for the role of Uncle Rico in Napoleon Dynamite  for which he was nominated for the Independent Spirit Award for Best Supporting Male, and also as recurring characters Roger Linus on Lost and Rusty the Bum on Seinfeld. He is also known for his roles in Martin, The Pretender, The Monster Squad, Running Scared, Real Genius, Dream Corp LLC, and The White Lotus.

Life and career
Gries is the son of writer, director, and producer Tom Gries. His first film role came at the age of 11, when he played the Boy Horace in the Charlton Heston film Will Penny, which was written and directed by his father. Some of his signature roles have come in cult classics. He played Lazlo Hollyfeld in Real Genius (1985), Azzolini in Rainbow Drive, Shawn McDermott in the TV series Martin (1992–1994), Ronnie Wingate in Get Shorty (1995), Harvey in The Rundown, and Uncle Rico in Napoleon Dynamite (2004). Gries has played a werewolf on several occasions, such as Fright Night Part 2 and The Monster Squad.  

In the historical Western film September Dawn, he played executed murderer John D. Lee, in a performance praised by critics who otherwise panned the film. He played Casey in the films Taken (2008), Taken 2 (2012), and Taken 3 (2014), and was also in TerrorVision, as O.D. He also lent his voice for the video game Hitman: Absolution.

Among his television roles are that of a terrorist in season two of the hit show 24 and as Broots on the NBC series The Pretender. He had a guest role on The X-Files in the episode "Sleepless". He played Dylan McKay's drug dealer in season 5 of Beverly Hills, 90210. He played Ben Linus's father Roger in a recurring role on the TV series Lost. He played Shawn on the Fox sitcom Martin during the first two seasons. He appeared twice in the TV series Quantum Leap—first, as a bookie in the episode "The Right Hand of God" and then as a band member in the episode "Glitter Rock". He appeared as Rusty the Bum in two episodes of Seinfeld. In 2007, he played the menacing dad to Samaire Armstrong in Around June. In 2008, he appeared in the CSI: NY episode "The Box" as the father of that episode's victim. In 2010, he wrapped production on A True Story. Based on Things That Never Actually Happened. ...and Some that Did and appeared in one episode of Nikita. He also played Martin in the TV show Supernatural in the episodes "Sam, Interrupted" (2010), "Hello, Cruel World" (2011) and "Citizen Fang" (2012). He played Bob, a former drug addict who operates a safe haven for abused Mexican women, in The Bridge. He played Strabinsky  in the TV Show Psych in the episode "One, Maybe Two, Ways Out" (2010).

Filmography

Film

Television

Video games

Music videos
As director
 Flies on Fire - "Long Gone Dead" (1989)
 Low Profile - "Pay Ya Dues" (1989)
 Low Profile - "That's Y They Do It (1989)
 Low Profile - "Funky Song" (1990)
 Mere Mortals - "Cracked" (2006)

As actor

 Alice in Chains - "Rooster" (1993)
  Lenny Kravitz - "Mr. Cab Driver" 1988

References

External links
 

1957 births
Living people
20th-century American male actors
21st-century American male actors
American male television actors
American male film actors
Film directors from California
Film producers from California
Male actors from Glendale, California